HD 224693 is a star in the equatorial constellation of Cetus, and is positioned near the western constellation border with Aquarius. It can be viewed with a small telescope but is too faint to be seen with the naked eye, having an apparent visual magnitude of 8.23. Based on parallax measurements, the object is located at a distance of approximately 306 light years from the Sun. It is drifting further away with a radial velocity of 1.5 km/s.

The star HD 224693 is named Axólotl. The name was selected in the NameExoWorlds campaign by Mexico, during the 100th anniversary of the IAU. Axólotl means water animal in the native Nahuatl language, which is an amphibious species from the basin of Mexico.

This is an ordinary G-type main-sequence star with a stellar classification of G2V. However, in 2006, Johnson and associates assigned it a class of G2 IV, suggesting it is instead an evolving subgiant star. It is about three billion years old and chromospherically quiet, with a projected rotational velocity of 4.2 km/s. The star is metal rich, showing a higher abundance of elements other than hydrogen and helium when compared to the Sun. It has 1.3 times the mass of the Sun and 1.8 times the Sun's radius. The star is radiating 3.78 times the luminosity of the Sun from its photosphere at an effective temperature of 5,971 K.

In 2006, an extrasolar planet was discovered orbiting HD 224693 by the Keck telescope using radial velocity measurements. A preliminary search for transits using photometric data from Fairborn Observatory was inconclusive because data around the predicted time of transit was too sparse to rule out possible transits. This exoplanet was named Xolotl, as the Aztec god of fire and lightning.

See also
 79 Ceti
 HD 222582
 HD 33283
 HD 86081
 List of extrasolar planets

References

External links
 

G-type main-sequence stars
G-type subgiants
Planetary systems with one confirmed planet
Cetus (constellation)
Durchmusterung objects
224693
118319